The mouse-colored thistletail (Asthenes griseomurina) is a species of bird in the family Furnariidae. It is found in Ecuador and Peru.

Its natural habitat is subtropical or tropical high-altitude grassland.

References

External links

Mouse-colored thistletail videos on the Internet Bird Collection
Mouse-colored thistletail photo gallery VIREO Photo-High Res

mouse-colored thistletail
Birds of the Ecuadorian Andes
Birds of the Peruvian Andes
mouse-colored thistletail
mouse-colored thistletail
Taxonomy articles created by Polbot